The Tartars/I Tartari is a 1961 Italian-Yugoslavian epic historical Technicolor film directed by Richard Thorpe and starring Victor Mature and Orson Welles. It is one of the sword-and-sandal genre films made in Italy in the 1950s and early 1960s.

Plot
In what is now Russia, a settlement of Vikings lives in peace with both the Tatars and the Slavs. All is well until Togrul (Folco Lulli), a Tatar chief seeks the help of Oleg (Victor Mature), the chief of the Vikings, to war on the Slavs in a surprise attack. Oleg refuses and the group does battle ending with Oleg killing Togrul and abducting Togrul's daughter Samia (Bella Cortez) as a hostage.

Togrul's brother Burundai (Orson Welles) is furious and wishes the Viking settlement burnt to the ground. "I am your Khan", he says to his troops. His high priest, Ciu Lang (Arnoldo Foà), reminds Burundai that Samia is promised to the leader of the Tatars as his wife; her safety and return has a higher priority than Burundai's revenge. Burundai gets his chance to retrieve Samia when a Viking longship is attacked, resulting in the capture of Oleg's wife Helga (Liana Orfei) and her handmaidens. Burundai initially promises to treat Helga well as an exchange for Samia but tortures Helga's handmaidens to discover the strength of the Vikings. He also rapes Helga and gives her to his men for their further pleasure prior to exchanging her for Samia. Meanwhile, Samia has fallen in love with Oleg's brother Eric (Luciano Marin).

When Oleg comes to make the exchange and Ciu Lang leads Helga out to the battlements of the Tatar fortress, she leaps down upon seeing Oleg below and is fatally injured. He takes her and Samia back to the Viking settlement, where Helga asks him to kiss her and dies. The grief-stricken Oleg is ready to kill Samia, but Eric reveals that she is pregnant by him and demands to marry her. Oleg has them tried for their lives by the tribal elders. Meanwhile, Ciu Lang counsels Burundai to get Samia back peacefully, but he has megalomaniac dreams of conquering the whole West, and he kills the priest and goes to lead the Tatars to wipe out the Vikings.

At the trial of Eric and Samia, the elders split their votes evenly between acquittal and death, leaving Oleg to cast the deciding vote. Just as he is about to, word comes that Burundai is attacking. He tells Eric to earn the second chance this gives him, organizes the women and children to flee to the Vikings in the mountains, and he and Eric lead the defense of the settlement by the men. The Tatars outnumber them and overwhelm the defenses; Oleg tells Eric to take Samia and go, and Eric rescues her from Tatar soldiers and gets her to a longship. Oleg fights Burundai, throws him into the water and drowns him; as he is saluting Eric and Samia on board their ship, a Tatar spear strikes him and kills him. The longship moves off as the settlement burns.

Cast
 Victor Mature as Oleg
 Orson Welles as Burundai
 Liana Orfei as Helga
 Arnoldo Foà as Ciu Lang
 Luciano Marin as Eric
 Bella Cortez as Samia
 Furio Meniconi as Sigrun
 Folco Lulli as Togrul

Production
Filming took place in Rome and Yugoslavia in October 1960. It was filmed using Italian Totalscope anamorphic lenses.

According to Orson Welles, the extended sword fight between Welles and Mature  "on which I worked day after day" was shot with no input from Mature.

Release
MGM issued the film on a double bill with Ride the High Country with The Tartars on the top of the bill.

Reception

Box office
Orson Welles told Peter Bogdanovich the film "made a lot of money- it got back its cost in New York alone... a perfectly legible drive in kind of movie."

According to MGM records the film made a profit of $34,000.

Critical
Variety called it an "unsatisfactory exploitation meller".

Orson Welles' enunciation has been praised while Victor Mature has been considered a miscast for not having the looks of an archetypal Viking. Critic Leonard Maltin calls the film "a routine spectacle", giving it 2 stars out of four.

Biography

References

External links
 
 
 

Yugoslav adventure films
Metro-Goldwyn-Mayer films
1961 films
1960s English-language films
English-language Italian films
English-language Yugoslav films
Fictional Vikings
Films based on European myths and legends
Films directed by Richard Thorpe
Films set in the Viking Age
Italian epic films
Historical epic films
Lux Film films
1960s historical films
Italian historical films
Films set in Russia
Films scored by Renzo Rossellini
1960s Italian films